Sir Richard Grenville (1542–1591) was an English sailor and soldier.

Richard Grenville may also refer to:

People

Grenville of Devon and Cornwall
Richard de Grenville (died after 1142), one of the Twelve Knights of Glamorgan
Richard Grenville (died 1550), MP for Cornwall in 1529
Richard Grenville (died 1577 or 1578), MP for Newport (Cornwall) and Dunheved
Sir Richard Grenville, 1st Baronet (1600–1658), Royalist leader in the English Civil War

Grenville of Buckinghamshire
Richard Grenville (1678–1727), British politician, Member of Parliament (MP) for Buckingham and Wendover
Richard Grenville-Temple, 2nd Earl Temple (1711–1779), British politician, MP for Buckingham and Buckinghamshire
Richard Grenville (British Army officer) (1742–1823), British Army general

Other people
Richard Grenville Verney, 19th Baron Willoughby de Broke (1869–1923), British peer and politician, MP for Rugby

Other uses
Sir Richard Grenville, a GWR 3031 Class locomotive
TSS Sir Richard Grenville (1891), a passenger tender vessel built for the Great Western Railway
TSS Sir Richard Grenville (1931)

See also
 Grenville (disambiguation)
 Richard Temple-Nugent-Brydges-Chandos-Grenville (disambiguation)